Didymuria is a genus of phasmids belonging to the family Phasmatidae.

The species of this genus are found in Australia.

Species:

Didymuria schultzei 
Didymuria violescens 
Didymuria virginea

References

Phasmatidae
Phasmatodea genera